G.Nius is a 1988 French action video game developed by Lankhor for Amiga and Atari ST.

Plot 
The player is a robot named G.Nius who has crash-landed his spaceship. He needs to escape the ship before it vaporizes by visiting every room to turn off a switch.

Development 
The game experienced significant distribution problems. The game was prevented from being sold in parts of France.

Reception 
The Games Machine felt the game could be annoying and confusing at times. ACE magazine praised the frenetic, zany action, as well as the aesthetics.

References

External links 
 ASM
 Powerplay

1988 video games
Action video games
Amiga games
Atari ST games
Europe-exclusive video games
Video games developed in France
Lankhor games